The Women's 100m Backstroke event at the 2003 Pan American Games took place on August 14, 2003 (Day 13 of the Games).

At this race, Gisela Morales won the first medal of her country in swimming at Pan American Games at all times.

Medalists

Records

Results

References
2003 Pan American Games Results: Day 13, CBC online; retrieved 2009-06-13.
usaswimming
SwimNews Results

Backstroke, Women's 100m
2003 in women's swimming
Swim